Labeobarbus altipinnis is a species of ray-finned fish in the  family Cyprinidae. It is endemic to the Lufira River system in central Africa.

References

altipinnis
Taxa named by Keith Edward Banister
Taxa named by Max Poll
Fish described in 1973
Endemic fauna of the Democratic Republic of the Congo